Edvaldo Santos (born 18 April 1966) is a Brazilian weightlifter. He competed in the men's lightweight event at the 1988 Summer Olympics.

References

1966 births
Living people
Brazilian male weightlifters
Olympic weightlifters of Brazil
Weightlifters at the 1988 Summer Olympics
Place of birth missing (living people)